Ceratomantis is an Asian genus of praying mantises in the family Hymenopodidae.

Species
The Catalogue of Life lists: 
 Ceratomantis ghatei
 Ceratomantis gigliotosi
 Ceratomantis kimberlae
 Ceratomantis saussurii
 Ceratomantis yunnanensis

References

External links
 

 
Insects of Asia
Mantodea genera